Southwest Pass is a narrow strait in Vermilion Parish in southern Louisiana in the United States. It connects the Gulf of Mexico to its south with Vermilion Bay to its north. It is bounded on the east by Marsh Island (in Iberia Parish) and on the west by the Louisiana mainland in southeastern Vermilion Parish.

Southwest Pass should not be confused with a channel in the Mississippi River Delta at the mouth of the Mississippi River also known as Southwest Pass.

Notes

References
Webster's New Geographical Dictionary. Springfield, Massachusetts: Merriam-Webster, Inc., 1984. .

External links
731233 (26-Southwest Pass, LA-7) Sectional Elevation of Southwest Pass Lighthouse, Louisiana, 1874

Bodies of water of Louisiana
Landforms of Vermilion Parish, Louisiana
Landforms of Iberia Parish, Louisiana
Straits of the United States
Straits of the Caribbean